Bard-e Pahn may refer to:
 Bard-e Pahn Abdol Latif
 Bard-e Pahn-e Zilayi